The 2013–14 Chicago Bulls season was the franchise's 48th season in the National Basketball Association (NBA). They finished the regular season with a record of 48-34, heading into the playoffs with the 4th seed in the Eastern Conference. They lost in the first round to the Washington Wizards in five games.

After a year absence, Derrick Rose returned to action during the season opener in Miami against the two-time defending champion Miami Heat, but on November 22, 2013, at Portland he injured his meniscus in his right knee and was once again put on injured reserve, ending his season after 10 games.

Besides losing Rose, on January 7, 2014, the Bulls traded Luol Deng to the Cleveland Cavaliers for Andrew Bynum, who was waived immediately after the trade. This was the Bulls' first season since 2003-04 that Deng was not on the roster.

Offseason

Draft picks

Summer League

Player departures
The San Antonio Spurs signed Marco Belinelli on July 11. On July 26, Nate Robinson signed with the Denver Nuggets. On October 7, Vladimir Radmanović announced that he would be retiring after 12 seasons in the NBA.

Player signings
On July 10, the Bulls signed Mike Dunleavy. The next day, Nazr Mohammed re-signed with the Bulls. The Bulls had signed Patrick Christopher, Mike James, Dahntay Jones, Kalin Lucas, Dexter Pittman, and D. J. White on September 27 to finalize its training camp roster.

Standings

Central Division

Eastern Conference

Game log

Preseason

|- style="background:#cfc;"
| 1
| October 5
| @ Indiana
| 
| Taj Gibson (18)
| Taj Gibson (12)
| Rose & Dunleavy (3)
| Bankers Life Fieldhouse15,273
| 1–0
|- style="background:#cfc;"
| 2
| October 7
| Memphis
| 
| Carlos Boozer (16)
| Mohammed & Gibson (6)
| Rose & Snell (3)
| Scottrade Center13,497
| 2–0
|- style="background:#cfc;"
| 3
| October 12
| @ Washington
| 
| Taj Gibson (18)
| Boozer, Gibson, & Dunleavy (8)
| Luol Deng (6)
| HSBC Arena (at Rio de Janeiro, Brazil)13,635
| 3–0
|- style="background:#cfc;"
| 4
| October 16
| Detroit
| 
| Derrick Rose (22)
| Taj Gibson (12)
| Kirk Hinrich (5)
| United Center21,405
| 4–0
|- style="background:#cfc;"
| 5
| October 18
| Indiana
| 
| Derrick Rose (32)
| Deng & Snell (6)
| Derrick Rose (9)
| United Center21,783
| 5–0
|- style="background:#cfc;"
| 6
| October 21
| Milwaukee
| 
| Derrick Rose (24)
| Carlos Boozer (10)
| Mike Dunleavy (5)
| United Center21,203
| 6–0
|- style="background:#cfc;"
| 7
| October 23
| @ Oklahoma City
| 
| Derrick Rose (26)
| Carlos Boozer (14)
| Derrick Rose (6)
| INTRUST Bank Arena15,004
| 7–0
|- style="background:#cfc;"
| 8
| October 25
| Denver
| 
| Carlos Boozer (24)
| Luol Deng (12)
| Derrick Rose (8)
| United Center21,773
| 8–0

Regular season

|- style="background:#fcc;"
| 1
| October 29
| @ Miami
| 
| Carlos Boozer (31)
| Joakim Noah (11)
| Deng & Rose (4)
| American Airlines Arena19,964
| 0–1
|- style="background:#cfc;"
| 2
| October 31
| New York
| 
| Derrick Rose (18)
| Joakim Noah (15)
| Luol Deng (6)
| United Center22,022
| 1–1

|- style="background:#fcc;"
| 3
| November 2
| @ Philadelphia
| 
| Carlos Boozer (22)
| Carlos Boozer (10)
| Rose & Hinrich (6)
| Wells Fargo Center15,782
| 1–2
|- style="background:#fcc;"
| 4
| November 6
| @ Indiana
| 
| Deng & Rose (17)
| Carlos Boozer (9)
| Kirk Hinrich (5)
| Bankers Life Fieldhouse18,165
| 1–3
|- style="background:#cfc;"
| 5
| November 8
| Utah
| 
| Luol Deng (19)
| Luol Deng (11)
| Luol Deng (9)
| United Center21,946
| 2–3
|- style="background:#cfc;"
| 6
| November 11
| Cleveland
| 
| Carlos Boozer (17)
| Taj Gibson (8)
| Rose & Hinrich (7)
| United Center21,778
| 3–3
|- style="background:#cfc;"
| 7
| November 15
| @ Toronto
| 
| Luol Deng (19)
| Deng & Noah (9)
| Carlos Boozer (6)
| Air Canada Centre19,800
| 4–3
|- style="background:#cfc;"
| 8
| November 16
| Indiana
| 
| Luol Deng (23)
| Taj Gibson (8)
| Kirk Hinrich (8)
| United Center22,158
| 5–3
|- style="background:#cfc;"
| 9
| November 18
| Charlotte
| 
| Luol Deng (21)
| Carlos Boozer (17)
| Kirk Hinrich (7)
| United Center21,628
| 6–3
|- style="background:#fcc;"
| 10
| November 21
| @ Denver
| 
| Derrick Rose (19)
| Luol Deng (13)
| Joakim Noah (8)
| Pepsi Center18,423
| 6–4
|- style="background:#fcc;"
| 11
| November 22
| @ Portland
| 
| Derrick Rose (20)
| Luol Deng (14)
| Rose, Hinrich & Noah (3)
| Moda Center20,618
| 6–5
|- style="background:#fcc;"
| 12
| November 24
| @ L.A. Clippers
| 
| Luol Deng (22)
| Nazr Mohammed (11)
| Kirk Hinrich (7)
| Staples Center19,245
| 6–6
|- style="background:#fcc;"
| 13
| November 25
| @ Utah
| 
| Carlos Boozer (26)
| Carlos Boozer (16)
| Kirk Hinrich (4)
| EnergySolutions Arena18,936
| 6–7
|- style="background:#cfc;"
| 14
| November 27
| @ Detroit
| 
| Luol Deng (27)
| Taj Gibson (8)
| Kirk Hinrich (7)
| Palace of Auburn Hills14,228
| 7–7
|- style="background:#fcc;"
| 15
| November 30
| @ Cleveland
| 
| Luol Deng (27)
| Joakim Noah (8)
| Luol Deng (11)
| Quicken Loans Arena17,296
| 7–8

|- style="background:#fcc;"
| 16
| December 2
| New Orleans
| 
| Luol Deng (37)
| Taj Gibson (14)
| Kirk Hinrich (11)
| United Center21,615
| 7–9
|- style="background:#cfc;"
| 17
| December 5
| Miami
| 
| Carlos Boozer (27)
| Joakim Noah (15)
| Kirk Hinrich (7)
| United Center22,125
| 8–9
|- style="background:#fcc;"
| 18
| December 7
| Detroit
| 
| Taj Gibson (21)
| Taj Gibson (10)
| Hinrich & Dunleavy (4)
| United Center21,737
| 8–10
|- style="background:#fcc;"
| 19
| December 10
| Milwaukee
| 
| Mike Dunleavy (24)
| Carlos Boozer (12)
| Kirk Hinrich (6)
| United Center21,303
| 8–11
|- style="background:#fcc;"
| 20
| December 11
| @ New York
| 
| Mike Dunleavy (20)
| Carlos Boozer (12)
| Joakim Noah (4)
| Madison Square Garden19,812
| 8–12
|- style="background:#cfc;"
| 21
| December 13
| @ Milwaukee
| 
| Joakim Noah (21)
| Joakim Noah (18)
| Kirk Hinrich (8)
| BMO Harris Bradley Center15,219
| 9–12
|- style="background:#fcc;"
| 22
| December 14
| Toronto
| 
| Luol Deng (17)
| Joakim Noah (12)
| D. J. Augustin (6)
| United Center21,386
| 9–13
|- style="background:#fcc;"
| 23
| December 16
| Orlando
| 
| Luol Deng (26)
| Carlos Boozer (13)
| D. J. Augustin (8)
| United Center21,200
| 9–14
|- style="background:#fcc;"
| 24
| December 18
| @ Houston
| 
| Jimmy Butler (20)
| Joakim Noah (10)
| D. J. Augustin (9)
| Toyota Center18,242
| 9–15
|- style="background:#fcc;"
| 25
| December 19
| @ Oklahoma City
| 
| Joakim Noah (23)
| Joakim Noah (12)
| Mike Dunleavy (6)
| Chesapeake Energy Arena18,203
| 9–16
|- style="background:#cfc;"
| 26
| December 21
| Cleveland
| 
| Carlos Boozer (19)
| Joakim Noah (18)
| D. J. Augustin (10)
| United Center21,658
| 10–16
|- style="background:#cfc;"
| 27
| December 25
| @ Brooklyn
| 
| Taj Gibson (20)
| Gibson & Noah (8)
| D. J. Augustin (5)
| Barclays Center17,732
| 11–16
|- style="background:#fcc;"
| 28
| December 28
| Dallas
| 
| Joakim Noah (20)
| Joakim Noah (10)
| Jimmy Butler (5)
| United Center22,099
| 11–17
|- style="background:#cfc;"
| 29
| December 30
| @ Memphis
| 
| Jimmy Butler (26)
| Boozer & Noah (10)
| D. J. Augustin (9)
| FedExForum17,688
| 12–17
|- style="background:#fcc;"
| 30
| December 31
| Toronto
| 
| Luol Deng (16)
| Joakim Noah (16)
| Joakim Noah (6)
| United Center21,507
| 12–18

|- style="background:#cfc;"
| 31
| January 2
| Boston
| 
| Joakim Noah (17)
| Joakim Noah (11)
| Joakim Noah (9)
| United Center21,721
| 13–18
|- style="background:#cfc;"
| 32
| January 4
| Atlanta
| 
| Mike Dunleavy (20)
| Gibson & Noah (12)
| D. J. Augustin (7)
| United Center21,539
| 14–18
|- style="background:#cfc;"
| 33
| January 7
| Phoenix
| 
| Taj Gibson (19)
| Joakim Noah (16)
| D. J. Augustin (9)
| United Center21,181
| 15–18
|- style="background:#cfc;"
| 34
| January 10
| @ Milwaukee
| 
| Carlos Boozer (19)
| Carlos Boozer (13)
| Joakim Noah (7)
| BMO Harris Bradley Center15,148
| 16–18
|- style="background:#cfc;"
| 35
| January 11
| Charlotte
| 
| D. J. Augustin (20)
| Joakim Noah (14)
| D. J. Augustin (12)
| United Center21,413
| 17–18
|- style="background:#fcc;"
| 36
| January 13
| Washington
| 
| Carlos Boozer (19)
| Joakim Noah (16)
| Kirk Hinrich (8)
| United Center21,287
| 17–19
|- style="background:#cfc;"
| 37
| January 15
| @ Orlando
| 
| Joakim Noah (26)
| Joakim Noah (19)
| D. J. Augustin (9)
| Amway Center16,489
| 18–19
|- style="background:#fcc;"
| 38
| January 17
| @ Washington
| 
| Kirk Hinrich (18)
| Joakim Noah (12)
| Joakim Noah (6)
| Verizon Center17,005
| 18–20
|- style="background:#cfc;"
| 39
| January 18
| Philadelphia
| 
| Joakim Noah (21)
| Joakim Noah (16)
| D. J. Augustin (8)
| United Center21,710
| 19–20
|- style="background:#cfc;"
| 40
| January 20
| L.A. Lakers
| 
| D. J. Augustin (27)
| Joakim Noah (21)
| Joakim Noah (6)
| United Center21,626
| 20–20
|- style="background:#cfc;"
| 41
| January 22
| @ Cleveland
| 
| D. J. Augustin (27)
| Joakim Noah (18)
| D. J. Augustin (7)
| Quicken Loans Arena16,890
| 21–20
|- style="background:#fcc;"
| 42
| January 24
| L.A. Clippers
| 
| Carlos Boozer (22)
| Joakim Noah (13)
| Joakim Noah (7)
| United Center21,755
| 21–21
|- style="background:#cfc;"
| 43
| January 25
| @ Charlotte
| 
| D. J. Augustin (28)
| Joakim Noah (10)
| Joakim Noah (8)
| Time Warner Cable Arena18,252
| 22–21
|- style="background:#fcc;"
| 44
| January 27
| Minnesota
| 
| Carlos Boozer (20)
| Carlos Boozer (14)
| D. J. Augustin (6)
| United Center21,637
| 22–22
|- style="background:#cfc;"
| 45
| January 29
| @ San Antonio
| 
| Jimmy Butler (19)
| Carlos Boozer (12)
| Joakim Noah (8)
| AT&T Center18,581
| 23–22

|- style="background:#fcc;"
| 46
| February 1
| @ New Orleans
| 
| D. J. Augustin (23)
| Joakim Noah (16)
| D. J. Augustin (7)
| New Orleans Arena17,799
| 23–23
|- style="background:#fcc;"
| 47
| February 3
| @ Sacramento
| 
| Jimmy Butler (17)
| Carlos Boozer (9)
| D. J. Augustin (7)
| Sleep Train Arena15,178
| 23–24
|- style="background:#cfc;"
| 48
| February 4
| @ Phoenix
| 
| Carlos Boozer (19)
| Joakim Noah (14)
| Jimmy Butler (4)
| US Airways Center16,636
| 24–24
|- style="background:#fcc;"
| 49
| February 6
| @ Golden State
| 
| Taj Gibson (26)
| Taj Gibson (13)
| Joakim Noah (11)
| Oracle Arena19,596
| 24–25
|- style="background:#cfc;"
| 50
| February 9
| @ L.A. Lakers
| 
| Joakim Noah (20)
| Joakim Noah (13)
| D. J. Augustin (6)
| Staples Center18,997
| 25–25
|- style="background:#cfc;"
| 51
| February 11
| Atlanta
| 
| Taj Gibson (24)
| Joakim Noah (16)
| Joakim Noah (11)
| United Center21,325
| 26–25
|- style="background:#cfc;"
| 52
| February 13
| Brooklyn
| 
| Carlos Boozer (15)
| Joakim Noah (13)
| Hinrich & Noah (7)
| United Center21,500
| 27–25
|- align="center"
|colspan="9" bgcolor="#bbcaff"|All-Star Break
|- style="background:#cfc;"
| 53
| February 19
| @ Toronto
| 
| Carlos Boozer (20)
| Mike Dunleavy (11)
| Joakim Noah (13)
| Air Canada Centre17,704
| 28–25
|- style="background:#cfc;"
| 54
| February 21
| Denver
| 
| D. J. Augustin (22)
| Joakim Noah (11)
| D. J. Augustin (8)
| United Center21,621
| 29–25
|- style="background:#fcc;"
| 55
| February 23
| @ Miami
| 
| Gibson & Noah (20)
| Joakim Noah (15)
| D. J. Augustin (5)
| American Airlines Arena19,848
| 29–26
|- style="background:#cfc;"
| 56
| February 25
| @ Atlanta
| 
| Mike Dunleavy (22)
| Joakim Noah (12)
| D. J. Augustin (6)
| Philips Arena12,418
| 30–26
|- style="background:#cfc;"
| 57
| February 26
| Golden State
| 
| Taj Gibson (21)
| Joakim Noah (17)
| Joakim Noah (7)
| United Center21,701
| 31–26
|- style="background:#cfc;"
| 58
| February 28
| @ Dallas
| 
| Taj Gibson (20)
| Taj Gibson (15)
| Gibson & Dunleavy (4)
| American Airlines Center20,398
| 32–26

|- style="background:#cfc;"
| 59
| March 2
| New York
| 
| D. J. Augustin (23)
| Joakim Noah (12)
| Joakim Noah (14)
| United Center21,739
| 33–26
|- style="background:#fcc;"
| 60
| March 3
| @ Brooklyn
| 
| D. J. Augustin (16)
| Carlos Boozer (13)
| Augustin & Dunleavy (4)
| Barclays Center17,732
| 33–27
|- style="background:#cfc;"
| 61
| March 5
| @ Detroit
| 
| D. J. Augustin (26)
| Jimmy Butler (12)
| Joakim Noah (11)
| Palace of Auburn Hills14,007
| 34–27
|- style="background:#fcc;"
| 62
| March 7
| Memphis
| 
| Taj Gibson (18)
| Boozer & Noah (8)
| Joakim Noah (6)
| United Center21,218
| 34–28
|- style="background:#cfc;"
| 63
| March 9
| Miami
| 
| D. J. Augustin (22)
| Joakim Noah (12)
| Joakim Noah (7)
| United Center22,028
| 35–28
|- style="background:#fcc;"
| 64
| March 11
| San Antonio
| 
| D. J. Augustin (24)
| Joakim Noah (8)
| Joakim Noah (7)
| United Center21,634
| 35–29
|- style="background:#cfc;"
| 65
| March 13
| Houston
| 
| Mike Dunleavy (21)
| Joakim Noah (10)
| Joakim Noah (9)
| United Center21,747
| 36–29
|- style="background:#cfc;"
| 66
| March 15
| Sacramento
| 
| Joakim Noah (23)
| Joakim Noah (11)
| Joakim Noah (8)
| United Center22,012
| 37–29
|- style="background:#fcc;"
| 67
| March 17
| Oklahoma City
| 
| Taj Gibson (16)
| Joakim Noah (12)
| Joakim Noah (9)
| United Center22,261
| 37–30
|- style="background:#cfc;"
| 68
| March 19
| @ Philadelphia
| 
| D. J. Augustin (20)
| Taj Gibson (13)
| Joakim Noah (6)
| Wells Fargo Center13,222
| 38–30
|- style="background:#fcc;"
| 69
| March 21
| @ Indiana
| 
| Butler & Augustin (17)
| Joakim Noah (13)
| Joakim Noah (6)
| Bankers Life Fieldhouse18,165
| 38–31
|- style="background:#cfc;"
| 70
| March 22
| Philadelphia
| 
| Joakim Noah (20)
| Taj Gibson (10)
| Butler & Augustin (6)
| United Center21,799
| 39–31
|- style="background:#cfc;"
| 71
| March 24
| Indiana
| 
| Taj Gibson (23)
| Carlos Boozer (10)
| Joakim Noah (8)
| United Center21,803
| 40–31
|- style="background:#fcc;"
| 72
| March 28
| Portland
| 
| Carlos Boozer (16)
| Carlos Boozer (12)
| D. J. Augustin (7)
| United Center22,055
| 40–32
|- style="background:#cfc;"
| 73
| March 30
| @ Boston
| 
| D. J. Augustin (33)
| Gibson & Noah (8)
| Joakim Noah (13)
| TD Garden18,624
| 41–32
|- style="background:#cfc;"
| 74
| March 31
| Boston
| 
| Mike Dunleavy (22)
| Gibson & Noah (11)
| D. J. Augustin (11)
| United Center21,494
| 42–32

|- style="background:#cfc;"
| 75
| April 2
| @ Atlanta
| 
| D. J. Augustin (23)
| Joakim Noah (10)
| Noah & Hinrich (6)
| Philips Arena17,029
| 43–32
|- style="background:#cfc;"
| 76
| April 4
| Milwaukee
| 
| Hinrich & Butler (17)
| Joakim Noah (13)
| D. J. Augustin (6)
| United Center21,996
| 44–32
|- style="background:#cfc;"
| 77
| April 5
| @ Washington
| 
| D. J. Augustin (25)
| Joakim Noah (12)
| Jimmy Butler (9)
| Verizon Center19,661
| 45–32
|- style="background:#cfc;"
| 78
| April 9
| @ Minnesota
| 
| D. J. Augustin (21)
| Joakim Noah (13)
| Joakim Noah (10)
| Target Center13,447
| 46–32
|- style="background:#cfc;"
| 79
| April 11
| Detroit
| 
| D. J. Augustin (24)
| Joakim Noah (12)
| Joakim Noah (10)
| United Center22,219
| 47–32
|- style="background:#fcc;"
| 80
| April 13
| @ New York
| 
| Jimmy Butler (17)
| Joakim Noah (17)
| Joakim Noah (9)
| Madison Square Garden19,812
| 47–33
|- style="background:#cfc;"
| 81
| April 14
| Orlando
| 
| Mike Dunleavy (22)
| Carlos Boozer (12)
| Joakim Noah (8)
| United Center22,087
| 48–33
|- style="background:#fcc;"
| 82
| April 16
| @ Charlotte
| 
| D. J. Augustin (17)
| Joakim Noah (13)
| Hinrich & Noah (6)
| Time Warner Cable Arena17,627
| 48–34

Playoffs

Game log

|- style="background:#fcc;"
| 1
| April 20
| Washington
| 
| Augustin & Hinrich (16)
| Joakim Noah (10)
| Joakim Noah (4)
| United Center21,694
| 0–1
|- style="background:#fcc;"
| 2
| April 22
| Washington
| 
| D. J. Augustin (25)
| Joakim Noah (12)
| D. J. Augustin (7)
| United Center21,663
| 0–2
|- style="background:#cfc;"
| 3
| April 25
| @ Washington
| 
| Mike Dunleavy, Jr. (35)
| Joakim Noah (9)
| D. J. Augustin (7)
| Verizon Center23,356
| 1–2
|- style="background:#fcc;"
| 4
| April 27
| @ Washington
| 
| Taj Gibson (32)
| Joakim Noah (15)
| Kirk Hinrich (7)
| Verizon Center20,356
| 1–3
|- style="background:#fcc;"
| 5
| April 29
| Washington
| 
| Hinrich & Butler (16)
| Joakim Noah (18)
| Joakim Noah (7)
| United Center21,752
| 1–4

Player statistics

Regular season

|- align="center" bgcolor="#f0f0f0"
|  || 56 || 9 || 30.4 || .419 || .411 || style="background:black;color:white;" | .893 || 2.0 || 5.1 || 0.86 || 0.05 || 14.5
|- align="center" bgcolor=""
|  || 70 || 70 || 28.4 || .452 || .000 || .764 || 8.4 || 1.5 || 0.70 || 0.31 || 13.8
|- align="center" bgcolor="#f0f0f0"
|  || 61 || 61 || style="background:black;color:white;" | 38.2 || .396 || .284 || .775 || 5.0 || 2.4 || style="background:black;color:white;" | 1.95 || 0.56 || 13.2
|- align="center" bgcolor="#f0f0f0"
|  || style="background:black;color:white;" | 76 || 55 || 31.1 || .426 || .376 || .854 || 4.2 || 2.3 || 0.79 || 0.57 || 11.1
|- align="center" bgcolor=""
|  || 6 || 0 || 3.7 || .429 || .500 || .000 || 0.7 || 0.2 || 0.00 || 0.00 || 2.5
|- align="center" bgcolor="#f0f0f0"
|  || style="background:black;color:white;" | 76 || 8 || 28.8 || .484 || .000 || .747 || 6.9 || 1.1 || 0.53 || 1.36 || 13.2
|- align="center" bgcolor=""
|  || 67 || 55 || 29.1 || .386 || .349 || .760 || 2.7 || 3.9 || 1.12 || 0.36 || 9.0
|- align="center" bgcolor="#f0f0f0"
|  || 11 || 0 || 7.0 || .238 || .200 || .000 || 0.6 || 1.5 || 0.18 || 0.00 || 1.0
|- align="center" bgcolor=""
|  || 6 || 0 || 8.0 || style="background:black;color:white;" | .625 || style="background:black;color:white;" | .600 || .500 || 0.8 || 0.3 || 0.17 || 0.00 || 2.5
|- align="center" bgcolor="#f0f0f0"
|  || 74 || 1 || 7.2 || .410 || .000 || .533 || 2.3 || 0.3 || 0.18 || 0.39 || 1.5
|- align="center" bgcolor=""
|  || 24 || 0 || 2.6 || .231 || .000 || .000 || 0.3 || 0.1 || 0.00 || 0.17 || 0.3
|- align="center" bgcolor="#f0f0f0"
|  || 74 || style="background:black;color:white;" | 74 || 34.9 || .476 || .000 || .731 || style="background:black;color:white;" | 11.3 || style="background:black;color:white;" | 5.4 || 1.24 || style="background:black;color:white;" | 1.50 || 12.4
|- align="center" bgcolor=""
|  || 10 || 10 || 31.1 || .354 || .340 || .844 || 3.2 || 4.3 || 0.50 || 0.10 || 15.9
|- align="center" bgcolor="#f0f0f0"
|  || 8 || 0 || 1.9 || .500 || .000 || .000 || 0.3 || 0.3 || 0.13 || 0.00 || 0.3
|- align="center" bgcolor=""
|  || 71 || 12 || 16.7 || .380 || .322 || .757 || 1.7 || 1.0 || 0.38 || 0.21 || 4.7
|- align="center" bgcolor="#f0f0f0"
|  || 19 || 2 || 12.7 || .242 || .200 || .688 || 1.0 || 1.5 || 0.11 || 0.21 || 2.4
|-align="center" bgcolor=""
|  || 1 || 0 || 2.0 || .000 || .200 || .000 || 0.0 || 0.0 || 0.00 || 0.00 || 0.0
|}

Roster

References

Chicago
Chicago Bulls seasons
Chicago
Chicago